OrangeHRM Inc. is a HR software company based in Secaucus, New Jersey, best known for its Human resource management system. OrangeHRM was founded by Sujee Saparamadu in 2005. OrangeHRM offers starter and advanced version for its clients.

History
Founder and CEO of OrangeHRM Sujee Saparamadu, started OrangeHRM in 2005 with four employees. OrangeHRM 1.0 was a free and open source version released to Soureforge in March 2006. 1.0 comprised features such as employee information management, employee self-service, and reporting. 

In 2010 OrangeHRM received a Series A investment from principal investors Larry Stefonic and David Axmark. David Axmark. David Axmark is also a co-founder of MySQL AB and a developer of the free database server, MySQL, is on the board of directors.

Products

Packages
 OrangeHRM Starter - Open Source Version
OrangeHRM Advanced

Platform
 People Management
HR Administration
Employee Management
Reporting & Analytics
Compensation
Payroll Connector
PTO / Leave Management 
Time Tracking
Talent Management
Recruitment (ATS)
On-boarding
Culture
Performance Management
Career Development
Training (LMS)

References 
https://www.orangehrm.com/resources/orangehrm-license/

https://www.24-7pressrelease.com/press-release/147085/orangehrm-closes-on-series-a-financing

https://www.orangehrm.com/company/about-us/about-orangehrm

https://sourceforge.net/projects/orangehrm/

Free business software
Human resource management software
Free human resource management software
Software companies of the United States
Software companies of Sri Lanka